His Daughter is a 1911 American short silent drama film directed by D. W. Griffith, starring Edwin August and featuring Blanche Sweet.

Cast
 Edwin August - William Whittier
 Florence Barker - Mary
 Linda Arvidson
 Wilfred Lucas
 Mack Sennett
 Blanche Sweet

See also
 D. W. Griffith filmography
 Blanche Sweet filmography

References

External links

1911 films
Biograph Company films
American black-and-white films
1911 drama films
Films directed by D. W. Griffith
1911 short films
American silent short films
Silent American drama films
1910s American films